Lisa Yuskavage (1962) is an American artist who lives and works in New York City. She is known for her figure paintings that challenge conventional understandings of the genre. While her painterly techniques evoke art historical precedents, her motifs are often inspired by popular culture, creating an underlying dichotomy between high and low and, by implication, sacred and profane, harmony and dissonance.

Education
Yuskavage was born in 1962 in Philadelphia, Pennsylvania. She attended the Tyler School of Art at Temple University, and studied abroad during her third year through the Tyler School of Art’s program in Rome, before obtaining her BFA in 1984. Yuskavage received her MFA from the Yale School of Art in 1986.

Work

Since the early 1990s, Yuskavage has been associated with a re-emergence of the figurative in contemporary painting. Of the artist’s paintings, critic Roberta Smith has written: "The combination of mixed subliminal messages, deliciously artificial color and forthright sexuality is characteristic of Ms. Yuskavage's work, as is the journey from high to low to lower culture within a relatively seamless whole."

Yuskavage’s oeuvre is characterized by her ongoing engagement with the history of painting, and in particular the genre of the nude. Her paintings also encompass landscape and still life genres, with all three often appear within a single work. Yuskavage’s use of color is imbedded in Renaissance techniques as well as Color Field painting, and she cites diverse inspirations, including Italian painter Giovanni Bellini, Dutch painter Johannes Vermeer, and French painter Edgar Degas.

Theoretically, her paintings are associated with psychologically driven theories of viewing, such as that of the gaze. However, the complexities inherent in her paintings deny singular interpretation; as curator and critic Christian Viveros-Fauné explains: "Yuskavage’s oeuvre ... succeeds exactly to the degree that it refuses to be pinned down to any one of its many conflicted meanings. 'I only load the gun', [Yuskavage] has been known to say to those who insist on viewing a painting as an explanation."

She had a New York exhibit sell out before it opened, and one of her paintings sold at auction for more than $1 million.

Yuskavage's work has been the subject of solo exhibitions at institutions worldwide, including the Institute of Contemporary Art, University of Pennsylvania, Philadelphia (2000); Centre d’Art Contemporain, Geneva (2001); Museo Tamayo Arte Contemporáneo, Mexico City (2006); and The Royal Hibernian Academy, Dublin (organized as part of Dublin Contemporary 2011).

In September 2015, Lisa Yuskavage: The Brood opened at the Rose Art Museum of Brandeis University in Waltham, Massachusetts. This major solo exhibition presented the artist’s work spanning 25 years. Additionally, Yuskavage is featured in the Metropolitan Museum of Art's new online series, The Artist Project, launched in March 2015, in which she discusses Édouard Vuillard’s The Green Interior (1891).

In 2020, The Baltimore Museum of Art and the Aspen Art Museum co-organized a solo presentation of the artist's work, Wilderness, focusing on the ways she has used landscape in her work since the earliest watercolor Tit Heaven series from the 1990s. The exhibition was first shown at the Aspen Art Museum in 2020 and travelled to the Baltimore Museum of Art in spring 2021.

Yuskavage's work was included in the 2022 exhibition Women Painting Women at the Modern Art Museum of Fort Worth.

In popular culture
Yuskavage's work Half-Family was featured in Season 2, Episode 4 ("Lynch Pin") of the Emmy-nominated Showtime series, The L Word.

Her work is also mentioned in the novel China Rich Girlfriend of the Crazy Rich Asians trilogy by Kevin Kwan.

In Tamara Jenkins' 2018 film Private Life, main characters Rachel (Kathryn Hahn) and Richard (Paul Giamatti) claim to be good friends with Yuskavage, whose artwork, gifted to them as a wedding present, hangs in their living room.

Awards
Yuskavage has been the recipient of honors and awards that include the Aspen Award for Art (2019); Temple University Gallery of Success Award (2005); the Founder's Day Certificate of Honor, Tyler School of the Arts, Philadelphia (2000); the Tiffany Foundation Grant (1996); and the MacDowell Colony Fellowship (1994).

Notable works in public collections

Helga (1993), San Francisco Museum of Modern Art
Asspicking, Foodeating, Headshrinking, Socialclimbing, Motherfucking Bad Habits (1996), Rose Art Museum, Waltham, Massachusetts
Foodeater (1996), from The Bad Habits suite, Yale University Art Gallery, New Haven, Connecticut
Red Head with Portraits (1996), Weatherspoon Art Museum, Greensboro, North Carolina
Wrist Corsage (1996), Museum of Modern Art, New York
Importance of Association II (1997), Denver Art Museum
Importance of Association IV (1997), Denver Art Museum
The Bad Habits suite (1996-1998), Buffalo AKG Art Museum, Buffalo, New York; Museum of Modern Art, New York; and Whitney Museum, New York
Manifest Destiny (1997-1998), Museum of Contemporary Art San Diego
Night Flowers (1999), Walker Art Center, Minneapolis; and Whitney Museum, New York
Northview (2000), Museum of Contemporary Art, Los Angeles
Northview (2000), Rubell Museum, Miami/Washington, D.C.
Big Northview (2001), Whitney Museum, New York
Kathy on a Pedestal (2001), Museum of Modern Art, New York; and Seattle Art Museum
Kathy Thinking (2002), Museum of Modern Art, New York; and Pennsylvania Academy of the Fine Arts, Philadelphia
Curlie G. (2003), Hirshhorn Museum and Sculpture Garden, Smithsonian Institution, Washington, D.C.
Lupe & Lola II (2003), Rubell Museum, Miami/Washington, D.C.
Angel (2004), Art Institute of Chicago
Kingdom (2006), Museum of Modern Art, New York; and Whitney Museum, New York
Persimmons (2006), Kunstmuseum Den Haag, The Hague, Netherlands
Forces (2007), Museum of Fine Arts, Houston; and Museum of Modern Art, New York
Bonfire (2013-2015), Metropolitan Museum of Art, New York
Night Classes at the Department of Painting Drawing and Sculpture (2018-2020), Art Institute of Chicago
Pink Studio (Rendezvous) (2021), Museum of Modern Art, New York

Publications
Lisa Yuskavage: Wilderness. Text by Christopher Bedford, Helen Molesworth, and Heidi Zuckerman. Conversation with Mary Weatherford. Published by Gregory R. Mill & Co, 2020. 
Lisa Yuskavage: Babie Brood / Small Paintings, 1985-2018. Text by Jarrett Earnest. Foreword by Hanna Schouwink. Published by David Zwirner Books, New York, 2019. 
Lisa Yuskavage: The Brood, Paintings 1991-2015. Texts by Christopher Bedford, Suzanne Hudson, Catherine Lord, Siddhartha Mukherjee, and Katy Siegel. Published by Skira Rizzoli, New York, 2015. 
Lisa Yuskavage. Published by David Zwirner, New York, 2006. 
Lisa Yuskavage. Texts by Tobias Ostrander and Christian Viveros-Fauné. Published by Museo Tamayo Arte Contemporáneo, Mexico City, 2006. 
Lisa Yuskavage: Small Paintings 1993-2004. Text by Tamara Jenkins. Published by Abrams Books, New York, 2004. 
Lisa Yuskavage. Texts by Claudia Gould, Marcia B. Hall, and Katy Siegel. Published by the Institute of Contemporary Art, University of Pennsylvania, Philadelphia, 1999. 
Lisa Yuskavage. Texts by Chuck Close and Faye Hirsch. Published by Smart Art Press, Santa Monica, California, 1996.

References

External links
Lisa Yuskavage Official Website
Lisa Yuskavage, The Artist's Project, The Metropolitan Museum of Art
Peter Schjeldahl, “Odd Twins Lisa Yuskavage and Edouard Vuillard,” The New Yorker, June 4, 2012
Andrea Scott, “Dangerous Beauty,” The New Yorker, October 24, 2011
Ken Johnson, “Lisa Yuskavage at David Zwirner,” The New York Times, October 7, 2011
Roberta Smith, “A Painter Who Loads the Gun and Lets the Viewer Fire It,” The New York Times, January 12, 2001
Peter Schjeldahl, “Purple Nipple,” The Village Voice, September 29, 1998

1962 births
American women painters
Living people
American contemporary painters
Artists from Philadelphia
Painters from New York City
Philadelphia High School for Girls alumni
Temple University Tyler School of Art alumni
Yale School of Art alumni
20th-century American painters
20th-century American women artists
21st-century American women artists